Ganadevata may refer to:
 Ganadevata (novel), 1942 Bengali novel written by Tarasankar Bandyopadhyay
 Ganadevata (film), 1978 Bengali film directed by Tarun Majumdar
 Ganadevata Express, express train in India